Shankar Nagar Square is a metro station on the Aqua Line of the Nagpur Metro. It was opened on 9 December 2020.

Station Layout

References

Nagpur Metro stations
Railway stations in India opened in 2020